Figino may refer to:

 Figino (district of Milan), a quarter in the Italian city of Milan.
 Figino, Switzerland, a settlement in the Barbengo quarter of the Swiss city of Lugano.